Adnan Aliev (born 14 November 1983) is a Bulgarian sprint canoer who competed in the late 2000s. At the 2008 Summer Olympics in Beijing, he finished seventh in the C-2 500 m event while being eliminated in the semifinals of the C-2 1000 m event.

References
 Sports-Reference.com profile

1983 births
Bulgarian male canoeists
Canoeists at the 2008 Summer Olympics
Living people
Olympic canoeists of Bulgaria